This is a list of programs broadcast by Knowledge Channel, a digital free-to-air and cable channel owned by ABS-CBN.

Current programming

Original programming

 Musikantahan (2022) - Music
 Animahenasyon (2010-2022) - Movies
Teacher Celine (2022) - Math
 Agham Aralin (2010) – Science
 Agos (2013) – Health
 AgriCOOLture (2015) – Technology and Livelihood Education
 Art Smart (2019) – Arts
 Carlos' Blog (2013) – English
 Census of Population (2016) – Araling Panlipunan
 Disaster Preparedness (2020) - General Information
 Ekonomiks (2013) – Araling Panlipunan
 Estudyantipid (2007) – Araling Panlipunan
 Faculty Room (2010) – Teacher's Program
 Gab To Go (2010) – English
 Ibang Klase (2011) – Alternative Learning System
 Travel Around The World (2010) - AP
 K-High (2010) – Math and Science
 K-High: Math Matters (2014) – Math
 K-Hub (2011) – Science
 Dok Ricky, Pedia (2014) - Health
 Kada Tropa (2011) – Alternative Learning System
 Kasaysayan TV (2001) – Araling Panlipunan
 Knowledge Factory (2019) – General Information
 Knowledge on the Go (2017) – General Information
 Kuwentong Kartero (2012) – Health
 Kuwentong Pambata (2013) – Filipino
 MathDali (2016) – Mathematics
 Mi Isla (2010) – Science
 Generation Math (2000) - Math
 Pamana (2001) – Araling Panlipunan
 Pamilyang Masigasig (2013) – Technology and Livelihood Education
 Payong K-Lusugan (2016) – Health
 Puno ng Buhay (2012) – Science
 Ready, Set, Read! (2020) – English 
 Science Says (2019) – Science
 Weather Wizards (2018) – Science
 Wikaharian (2019) – Filipino
 Wow! (2011) – Araling Panlipunan
 Bayan E-skwela (2022) - Parent Teacher Activity Time & Math
 World History (2022) - Araling Panlipunan
 Team Lyqa (2022) - English & Filipino
 Scribbr (2022) - English Filipino and Math
 Ser Ian's Class (2022) - Araling Panlipunan
 Lahi PH (2022) - English
 Kwentoons (2015) - Cartoons And Math
 From Lines to Life (2012) - Filipino
 Art Smart With Teacher Precious (2022) - English
 K-High Science (2013) - Science
 Noli Me Tangere (1992) - Filipino
 Basic Geography (1989) - AP
 Numberbender (2022) - Math
 Khan Academy (2023) - Math

ABS-CBN/ETV

 Art Jam (2006) – Arts
 ATBP: Awit, Titik at Bilang na Pambata (1999) – Filipino
 Basta Sports (2007) – Physical Education
 Bayani (1999) – Araling Panlipunan
 Busog Lusog (2008) – Health
 Epol/Apple (1999) – English
 Hiraya Manawari (1999) – Edukasyon sa Pagpapakatao
 I Got It! (2011) – General Information
 Kulilits (2011) – General Information
 Math-Tinik (1999) – Math
 Pahina (2001) – Filipino
 Salam (2007) – Araling Panlipunan
 Sining sa Lipunan (2004) – Arts
 Sine'skwela (1999) – Science
 Why Not? (2011) – Health

Acquired programming

PTV (Constel, 1995–1998)
Chemistry in Action – Science
Constel English – English
 Constel Literature – English
Physics in Everyday Life – Science
Science Made Easy – Science

NBN/RPN (Eskwela ng Bayan, 2002–2003) 
Alikabuk (2002) – Filipino
Karen's World (2002) – English
Solved (2002) – Math
Why? (2002) – Science

Others
1001 Nights (2021)
Agri Tayo Dito (aired on ABS-CBN Davao from 2012 to 2018)
ArtRepublik TV (2011)
Kumikitang Kabuhayan (2008)
Lakbay TV (2008)
 Local Legends (2019)
 Mang Lalakbay (2022)
Matanglawin (also airs on ABS-CBN, Jeepney TV and DZMM TeleRadyo, 2011)
Mukha (also airs on ANC)
My Puhunan (also airs on ANC, ABS-CBN and DZMM TeleRadyo, 2016)
#NoFilter (2019)
Oyayi (2018)
Sesame Street 
Tipong Pinoy (aired on GMA-7 from 1998 and IBC-13 from 2010 to 2015)
Travel Time (2010)

Former programming

Original programming 
 TalkED (2023) - PTA Mathdali Live (2024) Math'

Knowledge Channel
Knowledge Channel